Dr. Cyrus Wadia is the Head of Sustainable Product at Amazon. Before that, he was Vice President, Sustainable Business & Innovation, NIKE, Inc., where he was responsible for enabling the company's sustainability strategy with the goal of driving change across Nike and the wider industry. The team he led focuses on several areas including testing and prototyping of new business models, accelerating partnerships for scaling sustainable innovations, and supporting Nike's broad innovation agenda through science and analytics.

Cyrus is the former Assistant Director for Clean Energy & Materials R&D with the White House Office of Science and Technology Policy where he advised the White House and Executive Branch leadership in the design of national policy in energy, climate, advanced materials, manufacturing, and critical minerals. In this role, which he held from 2010–2015, Cyrus was responsible for the creation and expansion of more than $1 billion in new budgetary initiatives, including the Materials Genome Initiative, and he led the development of the nation's first policy framework and strategy on critical minerals.

Prior to joining the White House, Cyrus held a dual appointment with Lawrence Berkeley National Lab and the Haas School of Business where he was the Co-Director of Cleantech to Market and a research scientist.  He also spent more than seven years in Silicon Valley as an entrepreneur, working with 15 venture-backed startups in Silicon Valley. In 2009, Cyrus was named one of MIT Technology Review's Top Innovators under 35. The Review cited his economic analysis of materials with good electrical properties that can effectively absorb sunlight, identifying two previously overlooked materials.

Since 2009, Cyrus has been a frequent speaker on sustainability, materials and innovation, with more than 65 keynote and invited speaking addresses. His work has been cited in more than 1,000 peer-reviewed scientific articles and he has patented methods for sustainable energy breakthroughs. US Patent 8425865 was granted for a method of synthesizing pyrite nanocrystals (aka fool's gold) as a non-toxic and naturally occurring candidate for photovoltaic material.

Cyrus earned his Ph.D in Energy & Resources from U.C. Berkeley, and holds both an M.S. and S.B. in Chemical Engineering from MIT.

Notes

 ABC News Segment
 How to Bring Solar Energy to 7BB People

 Materials Data for the Masses. Chemical & Engineering News, Feb 20th, 2012; Jacoby, M.
 Advanced Manufacturing and New Materials.Technology Review, July 11, 2011; Bourzac, K.
 US Materials Genome Initiative Takes Shape. Nature, Nov 28th, 2011; Reich, E.
 Mining Fool's Gold for Solar. MIT Technology Review. Oct. 20, 2009.
 2CNER Tokyo Symposium, 2014
 Inside the White House: Solar Panels
 Materials Genome Initiative: Three Years of Progress

References

External links

Analysis Hints at Solar Energy Alternatives, Chemistry World, 26 Feb 2009, Notman, N.
 Fool's Gold could slash cost of solar power. BusinessGreen. 20 Feb 2009. Young, T.

Living people
Year of birth missing (living people)
Haas School of Business faculty
American people of Indian descent
American people of Parsi descent